{{Taxobox
| fossil_range = 
| regnum = Animalia
| phylum = Arthropoda
| classis = Trilobita
| ordo = Ptychopariida
| superfamilia = Crepicephaloidea
| subdivision_ranks = Species
| subdivision = * Coosella helena
 Coosella intermediens
 Coosella prolifica
| familia = Crepicephalidae
| genus = Coosella| genus_authority = Lochman, 1936
}}Coosella'' is an extinct genus from a well-known class of fossil marine arthropods, the trilobites. It lived from 501 to 490 million years ago during the Dresbachian faunal stage of the late Cambrian Period.

References

Ptychopariida genera
Cambrian trilobites
Extinct animals of North America
Fossils of Georgia (U.S. state)
Paleozoic life of Newfoundland and Labrador
Paleozoic life of Yukon

Cambrian genus extinctions